Francesco Maria Brancaccio (15 April 1592, in Canneto, near Bari – 9 January 1675) was an Italian Catholic cardinal.

Naples

Brancaccio was born on 15 April 1592, the son of Baron Muzio II Brancaccio, governor of Apulia and Zenobia in the Kingdom of Naples. He was educated by the Jesuits in Naples. He was ordained there as a priest in 1619 and was rose through local ecclesiastic ranks until 1627 when he became Bishop of Capaccio which was then within the Kingdom of Naples. On 8 Sep 1627, he was consecrated bishop by Cosimo de Torres, Cardinal-Priest of San Pancrazio, with Giuseppe Acquaviva, Titular Archbishop of Thebae, and Francesco Nappi (bishop), Bishop of Polignano, serving as co-consecrators. While a bishop, he came into conflict with the local foot guards with whom he had a disagreement about local ecclesiastic jurisdiction. When the disagreement was elevated to armed conflict, a castrato in Brancaccio's employ killed the captain of the guard. The Vice-King ordered the bishop to stand trial and he obeyed; making arrangements to travel to Naples to give his account. But rather than travel to Naples he fled in a felucca towards Rome and upon arrival sought an audience with Pope Urban VIII to explain his side of the story. Urban agreed to defend the bishop and a furious Kingdom of Naples took custody of all the wealth and assets of Brancaccio's bishopric.

Pope Urban absolved Brancaccio of any crime and ordered that he be returned to Capaccio but the Vice-King opposed it and urged the pope to send him elsewhere. The Pope, in need of more cardinals loyal to the Barberini cause, instead kept Brancaccio in Rome and he was elevated to the rank of cardinal in his consistory of 28 November 1633.

Cardinalate

Now as a cardinal, there were few who would publicly speak ill of Brancaccio, though they may have wanted to. He was restored to his bishopric where he remained until 1635 when yet another conflict with yet another Vice-King saw him resign. While in Naples he worked closely with cardinals Francesco Boncompagni and Ippolito Aldobrandini.

He became Bishop of Viterbo in 1638; then he became cardinal-bishop of Sabina (1666–68), of Frascati (1668–71), and finally of Porto e Santa Rufina (1671–75).  He attended the papal conclaves of 1644, 1655, 1667 and 1669, which elected popes Innocent X, Alexander VII, Clement IX and Clement X respectively.

Patron of the arts

During his time in Rome he formed the Biblioteca Brancacciana (which later moved to Naples and became that city's first public library – it is now part of the National Library of Naples) and housed the artist Salvator Rosa.

In 1642 Giovanni Gentile dedicated a teaching-collection of music entitled Solfeggiamenti et ricercari a due voci (Solfèges and ricercari for two voices – Lodovico Grignani, Rome, 1642) to him.  The frontispiece gives him as "CARD. FRANCESCO MARIA / BRANCACCIO. / VESCOVO DI VITERBO" ("Cardinal Francesco Maria Brancaccio, bishop of Viterbo") and in the appendices is a canon in two voices "Cavato dalle lettere vocali del nome, e cognome / DELL'EMINENTISSIMO E REVERENDISSIMO / CARDINALE BRANCACCIO" ("Based on the vocal letters of the name and surname of the most eminent and most reverend / cardinal Brancaccio").

Episcopal succession

References and notes

External links
 Dedication by G. Gentile, to Cardinale Brancaccio

1592 births
1675 deaths
17th-century Italian Roman Catholic bishops
Cardinal-bishops of Frascati
Cardinal-bishops of Porto
Cardinal-bishops of Sabina
Cardinals created by Pope Urban VIII
Bishops of Viterbo
17th-century Italian cardinals